Muhammad ibn Qu (fl. 14th century) was the eighth mansa of the Mali Empire. He succeeded his father, Mansa Qu, and was the predecessor of Mali's most famous ruler, Mansa Musa. The exact dates of Muhammad ibn Qu's reign are not known with certainty, though his reign was certainly brief. His father's predecessor, Sakura, was killed at some point between 1298 and 1308 and his own successor Musa took the throne in 1307 or 1312. Musa said that his predecessor (whom he did not specifically name) disappeared leading an expedition into the Atlantic Ocean.

References

See also
Keita Dynasty
List of people who disappeared mysteriously at sea
Mali Empire

14th-century monarchs in Africa
Keita family
People of the Mali Empire
Mansas of Mali
People lost at sea
Year of birth unknown